Samuel Strettle MM (2 February 1886 – 25 August 1926) was an English professional footballer who made over 120 appearances in the Midland League for Chesterfield Town as a full back. He also played for Everton in the Football League and made over 100 appearances in the Southern League for Exeter City.

Personal life 
Strettle was married with one child. He served as a lance corporal in the 58th (2/1st London) Division Signal Company of the Royal Engineers during the First World War and was awarded the Military Medal during the course of his service. Strettle died of tuberculosis at Hefferston Grange Sanatorium in 1926 and was buried in Warrington Cemetery.

Career statistics

References 

1886 births
Footballers from Warrington
English footballers
Everton F.C. players
Association football fullbacks
English Football League players
British Army personnel of World War I
Chesterfield F.C. players
Royal Engineers soldiers
1926 deaths
Southern Football League players
Midland Football League players

Recipients of the Military Medal
Llandudno F.C. players
20th-century deaths from tuberculosis
Tuberculosis deaths in England